Hopcroft is a surname. Notable people with the surname include:

John Hopcroft (born 1939), American theoretical computer scientist
Ron Hopcroft (1918–2016), British ultrarunner

See also
Holcroft
Howcroft